Sarah Elisabeth Murray (born 3 December 1970) is a British Anglican priest. Since 2017, she has served as Provost of Inverness Cathedral in the Scottish Episcopal Church.

Early and personal life
Murray was born on 3 December 1970 in Newport, Isle of Wight, England. She was educated at St Mary's Hall, an all-girls private school in Brighton.

Ordained ministry
Murray studied at the University of Aberdeen, graduating with a Bachelor of Theology (BTh) degree in 2012, and trained for ordination at the Theological Institute of the Scottish Episcopal Church. She was ordained as a deacon in 2013 and as a priest in 2014. From 2013 to 2016, she served as a curate in the Isla Deveron Group in the Diocese of Moray, Ross and Caithness.

In July 2016, Murray was installed as the Vice-Provost of the Cathedral Church of Saint Andrew, Inverness (commonly called Inverness Cathedral). She became Provost of Inverness Cathedral in October 2017.

References

1970 births
Living people
Scottish Episcopalian priests
21st-century Anglican priests
Alumni of the University of Aberdeen
People from Newport, Isle of Wight